Wringe is a surname. Notable people with the surname include:

 Bill Wringe (born 1970), British philosopher and the author of An Expressive Theory of Punishment
 Colin Wringe (born 1937), British educational theorist

German-language surnames
Surnames of Scandinavian origin